Hasmukh Goswami College of Engineering (HGCE) is a private degree engineering and degree management college located near Vahelal village, district Ahmedabad in Gujarat state, India. The college is affiliated to the GTU and all of the courses are approved by the AICTE.

The college motto is 'Teaching Technology for Mankind'.

The college offers four bachelor's degree courses:
 Computer Engineering,
 Mechanical Engineering,
 Electronics and Communications,
 Information Technology.
 
The college offers a master's degree in Business Administration - MBA.

Admissions are done through the Admission Committee for Professional Courses (ACPC).

References

External links 
 
 Video of College Anthem " HGCE laya naya savera " 

Engineering colleges in Gujarat
Educational institutions established in 2007
Ahmedabad district
2007 establishments in Gujarat